Mirna (Croatian "Mirna"; Serbian "Мирна") is a female name common among Croats and Serbs. Derived from the Slavic element mir, Mirna  means "peaceful." It is often confused with the name "Myrna"(/myrrhna/), which is not Slavic in origin, but Celtic and means "beloved" and also "tender." In Circassian culture, Mirna means "This Eye": "Mir" stands for "this" and "Na" stands for "Eye".

Notable people with the given name Mirna 
 Mirna Abdulaal, Egyptian journalist
 Mirna Deak (born 1974), Croatian basketball player
 Mirna Doris (born 1942), Italian Canzone Napoletana singer
 Mirna Funk (born 1981), German journalist
 Mirna Esmeralda Hernández (born 1961), Mexican politician
 Mirna van der Hoeven (born 1948), Dutch sprinter
 Mirna Jukić (born 1986), Austrian swimmer of Croatian origin
 Mirna Khayat, Lebanese music video producer
 Mirna Louisa-Godett (born 1954), Prime Minister of the Netherlands Antilles
 Mirna Velázquez López (born 1957), Mexican politician
 Mirna Mazić (born 1985), Croatian basketball player
 Mirna Medaković (born 1985), Croatian actress
 Mirna Murr, Lebanese politician
 Mirna Ortiz (born 1987), Guatemalan racewalker
 Mirna Camacho Pedrero (born 1959), Mexican politician
 Mirna Radulović, Serbian singer-songwriter
 Mirna Valerio, American runner
 Mirna Rincón Vargas (born 1959), Mexican politician

References 
 http://www.thinkbabynames.com/meaning/0/Mirna, - Origin and Meaning of Mirna 
 http://www.babynamesfamily.com/meaning_of_names/celtic_name_Mirna.html, Meaning of Mirna - Celtic Baby Name Mirna
 http://www.behindthename.com/name/mirna, Behind the Name: Meaning, Origin and History of the Name Mirna

Croatian feminine given names
Serbian feminine given names
Arabic feminine given names